Maureen Abla Amematekpor (born 1954) is a retired Ghanaian diplomat and a former Ghana Ambassador to Namibia and Botswana.

Career 
Amematekpor was a lecturer at Ho Polytechnic from 1979 to 1992. In 1984 she received an exam from the University of Education Winneba. from 1992 to 2001. She had a Chair at the Ho Polytechnic. In 2003, Amematekpor acquired a degree in business management; in 2004 she received a  Master of Business Administration  from Universität Maastricht.

From 30 July 2002 to 13 February 2006, she was Ghana High Commissioner in Windhoek, Namibia, with Commission for Gaborone, Botswana. From 13 February 2006 to 2009, she was an ambassador in Copenhagen, Denmark, and at the same time accredited in the four Nordic countries of Sweden, Norway, Finland and Iceland.

References 

1954 births
Living people
High Commissioners of Ghana to Namibia
High Commissioners of Ghana to Botswana
Ambassadors of Ghana to Denmark
Ambassadors of Ghana to Norway
Ambassadors of Ghana to Sweden
Ambassadors of Ghana to Finland
Ambassadors of Ghana to Iceland
University of Education, Winneba alumni
Ghanaian women ambassadors